V. Somasundaram is an Indian politician and was a member of the 14th Tamil Nadu Legislative Assembly from 2011 to 2016  Kancheepuram constituency. He represented the All India Anna Dravida Munnetra Kazhagam party. He was the Handlooms and Textiles minister during AIADMK's previous governing period during 2001 to 2006  from the Uthiramerur constituency.

The elections of 2016 resulted in his constituency being won by C. V. M. P. Ezhilarasan.

References 

Tamil Nadu MLAs 2011–2016
All India Anna Dravida Munnetra Kazhagam politicians
Living people
Tamil Nadu MLAs 2001–2006
Year of birth missing (living people)